Daniele Crosta (born 5 May 1970) is an Italian fencer. He won a bronze medal in the team foil event at the 2000 Summer Olympics.

References

External links
 
 
 
 
 

1970 births
Living people
Italian male fencers
Olympic fencers of Italy
Fencers at the 2000 Summer Olympics
Olympic bronze medalists for Italy
Olympic medalists in fencing
People from Busto Arsizio
Medalists at the 2000 Summer Olympics
Sportspeople from the Province of Varese